Cathal Seán Coughlan (3 October 1937 – 21 June 1986) was an Irish Fianna Fáil politician. He was first elected to Dáil Éireann in a 1983 by-election caused by the death of his brother, Clement Coughlan. His tenure as a Teachta Dála (TD) for Donegal South-West was short as he died suddenly in June 1986. No by-election was held to fill the vacancy, but his daughter, Mary Coughlan, was elected for the constituency at the 1987 general election.

See also
Families in the Oireachtas

References

1937 births
1986 deaths
Cathal
Fianna Fáil TDs
Members of the 24th Dáil
Local councillors in County Donegal
Politicians from County Donegal